Asuman is a Turkish feminine given name. Notable people with this name include:
Asuman Aksoy, Turkish-American mathematician
Asuman Baytop (1920–2015), Turkish botanist
Asuman Dabak (born 1970), Turkish actor
Asuman Güzelce (born 1969), Turkish writer and art teacher
Asuman Karakoyun (born 1990), Turkish volleyball player
Asuman Kiyingi (male, born 1963), Ugandan lawyer and politician
Asuman Krause (born 1976), German-Turkish model, singer, tv host, and beauty contestant
Asuman Özdağlar (born 1974), Turkish electrical engineering academic

Turkish feminine given names